The Power of Yes is a 2009 play by English playwright David Hare. It is the story of a dramatist seeking to understand the financial crisis of 2007–2008.

External links
The Power of Yes (archived) at National Theatre

2009 plays
Works about the Great Recession
Plays by David Hare
Fiction set in 2007
Plays based on actual events